William Alexander McKee (Q4 1919 – September 1986) was an Irish first-class cricketer.

Born at Coleraine in the fourth quarter of 1919, McKee played one first-class cricket match for Ireland against Scotland in 1946 at Greenock. He scored 16 runs in the match and went wicket-less with his right-arm fast-medium bowling. He died in September 1986.

References

External links
William McKee at ESPNcricinfo

1919 births
1986 deaths
People from Coleraine, County Londonderry
Cricketers from Northern Ireland
Irish cricketers
Sportspeople from County Londonderry